David Alderton is an English writer specialising in pets and natural history topics. Growing up in a home surrounded by pets, he originally trained to become a veterinary surgeon. An allergic dermatitis acquired in his final year of study forced a change of career however, and so led him into the field of writing about pets and their care. He has since become a regular contributor of articles on this subject to a wide range of newspapers and magazines in the UK and abroad, and also participates frequently in radio and television programmes. As of 2010 his books have sold over five million copies, and have been translated into 30 different languages. Alderton's titles have won awards in the US from the Cat Writers' Association of America and the Maxwell Medallion from the Dog Writers' Association of America, as well as being nominated for the Sir Peter Kent Conservation Book Prize. He has also chaired the National Council for Aviculture, the umbrella organisation for bird-keeping clubs and associations in the UK.

Selected bibliography
 Animals, published by Amber Books LTD, 2009
 Encyclopedia of Aquarium and Pond Fish, published by Dorling Kindersley, 2008
 Your Dog Interpreter, published by Reader's Digest, 2007
 Firefly Encyclopedia of the Vivarium, published by Firefly Books, 2007
 Chinchillas (Animal Planet Pet Care Library), published by TFH Publications, 2007
 Young at Heart (Caring for the Older Dog), published by Reader's Digest, 2007
 Your Cat Interpreter, published by Reader's Digest, 2006
 The Illustrated Encyclopedia of Birds of the World (with illustrator Peter Barrett), published by Southwater, 2004
 Horses (DK Pockets), published by Dorling Kindersley, 2003
 Smithsonian Handbook : Dogs, published by Dorling Kindersley, 2002
 Smithsonian Handbook : Cats, published by Dorling Kindersley, 2002
 Hamster (Collins Family Pet Guides), published by Collins, 2002
 Budgerigar (Collins Family Pet Guides), published by Collins, 2002
 The Small Animals Question and Answer Manual, published by Barron's Educational, 2001
 Hounds of the World (with photographer Bruce Tanner), published by Swan Hill Press, 2000
 Rodents of the World (with photographer Bruce Tanner), published by Cassell, 1999
 Foxes, Wolves & Wild Dogs of the World (with photographer Bruce Tanner), published by Cassell, 1998
 Wild Cats of the World (with photographer Bruce Tanner), published by Cassell, 1993

References

External links
petinfoclub.com

English male writers
1956 births
Living people